Alfred Sydney Owen (c. 1885 – 22 August 1925) was an English footballer who played as a forward for Stoke, Stockport County, Port Vale, Leicester Fosse, Newcastle Town, Blackpool, Northern Nomads, and English Wanderers. He scored a hat-trick for the England amateurs team in a 7–0 win over Sweden at Anlaby Road on 6 November 1909. Owen was the brother of Wally, who played for North Staffs Nomads, Stoke, Manchester City and Port Vale.

Club career
Owen played for North Staffs Nomads, before playing one First Division match for Stoke in the 1906–07 relegation season. He also played one Second Division game for Stockport County, before guesting for Port Vale in a 1–0 win over Hanley Town in a North Staffordshire Federation League match at the Athletic Ground on 26 October 1907. He then returned to Stoke, and scored his first league goal at the Victoria Ground in a 3–0 win over Lincoln City on 11 April 1908. He bagged a hat-trick a fortnight later, in a 4–0 win over Barnsley, and finished the 1907–08 season with four goals in five games. Stoke then quit the Football League, and Owen scored two goals in four Birmingham & District League games at the start of the 1908–09 season. He then moved on to Leicester Fosse. In September 1908, he returned to play two league and one cup game for Port Vale, before heading back to Leicester the following month. Afterwards he moved on to Newcastle Town, Blackpool, Stoke (without playing a game), Northern Nomads and English Wanderers.

International career
Owen netted five goals in just three appearances for the England amateur team in 1909 and 1910. He made his debut for the team on 6 November 1909 against Sweden, netting a hat-trick in a 7–0 win. He then scored one goal in both his second and last cap, a 9–1 win over the Netherlands and a 2–2 draw with Belgium. He also made an unofficial appearance against Ireland, scoring in a dramatic 4–4 draw, which was the first time the Amateurs failed to win.

International goals
England Amateurs score listed first, score column indicates score after each Owen goal.

Career statistics
Source:

References
Specific

General
 

1880s births
1925 deaths
Sportspeople from Newcastle-under-Lyme
English footballers
England amateur international footballers
Association football forwards
Stoke City F.C. players
Stockport County F.C. players
Port Vale F.C. players
Leicester City F.C. players
Blackpool F.C. players
Newcastle Town F.C. players
Northern Nomads F.C. players
English Football League players